The Master of Sacred Theology  (abbreviated STM) is a graduate-level, North American, academic degree in theology equivalent to ThM requiring two semesters of full time study. The Roman Catholic degree of Licentiate in Sacred Theology (STL) typically requires four semesters. An honorary title of STM is also awarded within the Dominican Order.

Requirements
One must normally have a Master of Divinity or Master of Arts degree in a theological field before being admitted to study for the STM. The STM typically is designed to enhance a student's academic credentials for entrance to a doctoral program.

STM degrees are typically awarded after having completed twenty-four hours of study at the master's level beyond that required for the first theological degree.  In some programs this degree may be awarded solely on the basis of taught academic courses.  However, many STM programs require or permit the student to write a thesis as a part of the degree requirements.  The thesis is especially helpful for those individuals who wish to use the STM to further their qualifications for doctoral study and who did not complete a thesis as a part of the first professional degree.  Some seminaries will also credit part of the work done for the STM towards a student moving on to the Doctor of Philosophy in theology degree once the STM has been awarded.

Roman Catholic
In Roman Catholic universities with pontifical charters, the equivalent is the Licentiate in Sacred Theology (STL), the intermediate degree between the STB (bachelor's) and STD (doctorate).  The STL is an additional two years of study beyond that required for the STB, often requiring comprehensive exams and a thesis. However, McGill University's graduate school of religious studies, considered partly a Catholic school of theology, offers the academic STM similar to the Protestant one.

Dominican title

In addition, the title Sacrae Theologiae Magister (STM) or Master of Sacred Theology is also the name given to an honorary title bestowed by the Roman Catholic Order of Preachers (Dominicans) on its most distinguished scholars.  Thus it is a "master's degree" in the most ancient sense and thus can be likened to an honorary doctorate conferred only upon Dominicans who are already scholars of theology.  The recipient must be a full-time professor for ten years and have published books and articles of international scholarly repute.  The initial nomination is made by the friar's own province (local district) and then must be approved by the intellectual commission of the Generalate in Rome.  The final decision is then made, after review, by the Master of this order and his council.  The regalia of the STM is a four-finned black biretta today usually trimmed with scarlet, and a ring, which may be set with an amethyst. The STM has the perpetual right to the title "very reverend". The Dominican archbishop of Cincinnati, John T. McNicholas, was famous for refusing to use DD (Doctor of Divinity) after his name; he insisted on using STM because it was the more distinguished academic title. His STD, of course, is a yet more distinguished title than either DD or STM as the STD is an earned degree and not an honorary one.

See also  
 Meister Eckhart

References

Christian education
Sacred Theology
Religious degrees